The 1959 Pittsburgh Panthers football team represented the University of Pittsburgh in the 1959 NCAA University Division football season.  The team compiled a 6–4 record under head coach John Michelosen.

Schedule

References

Pittsburgh
Pittsburgh Panthers football seasons
Pittsburgh Panthers football